Enemies of the Law is a 1931 American crime film directed by Lawrence C. Windom and starring Mary Nolan, Johnnie Walker and Lou Tellegen.

Cast
 Mary Nolan as Florence Vinton
 Johnnie Walker as Larry Marsh
 Lou Tellegen as Eddie Swan
 Harold Healy as Jack
 Alan Brooks as Lefty
 Dewey Robinson as Tony Catello
 John Dunsmuir as The Big Shot
 Danny Hardin as Joey Regan
 Bert West as Babe Ricardo
 Gordon Westcott as Blackie
 Doe Doe Green as Booker T

References

Bibliography
 Wagner, Laura. Hollywood's Hard-Luck Ladies. McFarland, 2020.

External links
 

1931 films
1931 crime films
American crime films
Films directed by Lawrence C. Windom
American black-and-white films
1930s English-language films
1930s American films